Edmund Sawyer (died 1759) was an English barrister. He became a master of chancery, and is known also as an officer of arms and historical compiler.

Life
Born shortly after 1687, he was probably ayounger son of Edmund Sawyer of White Waltham, Berkshire, by his wife Mary, second daughter of John Finch of Fiennes, Berkshire. He was of the Inner Temple, but then on 28 April 1718 was admitted member of Lincoln's Inn.

Undertaking legal business for John Montagu, 2nd Duke of Montagu, Sawyer became through the Duke's connection gentleman-usher to the Order of the Bath in 1725, and Brunswick herald in 1726. The latter involved him in the 1727 in the coronation of George II of Great Britain. In 1738 he was made a master in chancery, and around this time he vacated the posts with the Order of the Bath. In 1750 he and Richard Edwards were nominated commissioners to examine the claims of the creditors of the African Company of Merchants.

Sawyer died a master in chancery, on 9 October 1759.

Works
Sawyer compiled Memorials of Affairs of State in the Reigns of Queen Elizabeth and King James London, 3 vols. 1725. It used the papers of Sir Ralph Winwood and Sir Henry Neville.

Notes

External links
Attribution

Year of birth missing
1759 deaths
English barristers
English officers of arms
English antiquarians